Jamesville Reservoir is a lake located by Jamesville, New York. Fish species present in the lake include bluegill, largemouth bass, yellow perch, black bullhead, tiger muskie, rock bass, smallmouth bass, pickerel, walleye, and pumpkinseed sunfish. There is carry down access located at the Jamesville Beach Park with the purchase of a day use fee.

References

Lakes of New York (state)
Lakes of Onondaga County, New York